Perfect recall may refer to:

 Eidetic memory, the ability of perfect memorization
 Hyperthymesia, another condition with extreme memory
 Perfect recall, a concept from game theory used to found subgame perfect equilibrium
 Wogan's Perfect Recall, a TV show

See also

 Total recall (disambiguation)